Adrian Ungur (born 22 January 1985) is a Romanian former tennis player who mainly competed on the ATP Challenger Tour. He was a member of the Romania Davis Cup Team and was coached by Fabrizio Fanucci. In June 2012, Ungur reached his career-high ATP singles ranking of World No. 79. His most notable result was a four set victory over former World No. 3 David Nalbandian in the first round of the 2012 French Open.

Personal life
In 2006 Adrian married Liana, who is also a professional tennis player and daughter of Romanian football legend Ilie Balaci.

Career

Juniors
Ungur reached as high as No. 10 in the junior singles world rankings in January 2003.

2012: Grand Slam debut and first top-10 win
Following some good results in Challenger events, Adrian entered into the main draw at the 2012 French Open, his first main draw appearance at Grand Slam level. He beat former world No. 3 David Nalbandian in the first round, before being defeated in four sets by Roger Federer in the second round – although he saved two match points in winning the third set.

2015: Maiden and Home doubles title 
In April at the Romanian Open partnering fellow Romanian Marius Copil, after saving five match points, they defeated Nicholas Monroe/Artem Sitak 17–15 in the match tiebreak to become the first Romanian team to win the Bucharest title since 1998 (Pavel/Trifu).

ATP career finals

Doubles: 1 (1 title)

ATP Challenger and ITF Futures finals

Singles: 36 (16–20)

Doubles: 10 (6–4)

Performance timeline

Singles

Davis Cup

Singles performances (5–3)

References

External links

 
 
 
 
 
 

1985 births
Living people
Sportspeople from Pitești
Romanian male tennis players
Romanian expatriates in Italy
Tennis players at the 2012 Summer Olympics
Olympic tennis players of Romania